Aleksander Cybulski (born 30 July 1962) is a former professional footballer who has had a playing career that has lasted over 40 years since his debut in 1980. His career highlights including six seasons in the I liga making 131 appearances in the Polish top division with Bałtyk Gdynia and Lechia Gdańsk. Other than short spells in Sweden and Belgium his entire playing career in Poland has been with clubs in the Pomeranian region of Poland. He has played for 10 different Pomeranian football teams and is known to have made over 100 appearances for Bałtyk Gdynia and over 200 appearances for Lechia Gdańsk. In the later years of his career and despite still playing regularly he held coaching roles with three clubs in the lower Polish leagues between 2009–2019, most recently being the head coach of Sztorm Mosty. He currently plays for Spójnia Sadlinki.

Career

Playing career
Cybulski started his career with in the youth levels of his local team Bałtyk Gdynia, making his debut against Lechia Gdańsk on 24 March 1980. In his first season with Bałtyk he played 5 times as the team won promotion to the I liga. In his first spell with Bałtyk he made 39 appearances scoring two goals. Cybulski then spent a season with Stoczniowiec Gdańsk before joining Lechia Gdańsk the season after. His debut for Lechia came in the Polish SuperCup which the team won by beating Lech Poznań 1-0. That season Cybulski also made 26 appearances scoring two goals as Lechia won the II liga, and played in Lechia's first ever European game in the UEFA Cup Winners' Cup against Juventus. The next four seasons Lechia played in the top division of Poland, with Cybulski making a total of 97 appearances in the I liga. Lechia were relegated at the end of the 1987–88 season to the II liga, with Cybulski leaving the club two seasons later. In his first spell with Lechia he played a total 176 league appearances for Lechia contributing 9 goals for the team. He then spent two seasons in Sweden with Hudiksvalls FF returning to Lechia Gdańsk for a season in 1992 making a further 18 league appearances. In total for Lechia Gdańsk Cybulski made 211 appearances and scored 9 goals. He then had a season in Belgium with CS Jemappes, returning to Poland the season after joining Pomezania Malbork. He played with Pomezania in the 1994–95 season with the club finishing 9th in the II liga, the club's highest ever league finish. After that historic season for Pomezania he returned to Bałtyk Gdynia, making a further 103 appearances over the next 5 seasons with Bałtyk, with a short 6-month spell at Wierzyca Starogard Gdański in the middle of that 5 season spell. In total at Bałtyk Gdynia he made 142 league appearances scoring 9 times for the club. Cybulski spent the next five seasons with Cartusia Kartuzy in the fourth tier, helping the club to win promotion to the III liga in his final season. He then spent time with Orzeł Trąbki Wielkie, KS Chwaszczyno, Spójnia Sadlinki, and GKS Kowale. After an 18 month period with GKS Kowale which was interrupted due to the Covid-19 pandemic, Cybulski returned to Spójnia Sadlinki with whom he played for before playing with GKS Kowale.

Coaching career
From 2009 until 2015 Cybulski was the head coach of KS Chwaszczyno taking the club from the sixth tier to the fourth tier. For the 2015-16 season he was in charge of Cartusia Kartuzy, being dismissed from his contract at the end of the season. In 2017 he became the manager of Sztorm Mosty.

Stats

Honours

Bałtyk Gdynia
II liga: 1979–80

Lechia Gdańsk
Polish SuperCup: 1983
II liga: 1983–84

References

1962 births
Living people
Bałtyk Gdynia players
Polonia Gdańsk players
Lechia Gdańsk players
Pomezania Malbork players
Cartusia Kartuzy players
Polish footballers
Association football defenders
Association football midfielders
Polish expatriate footballers
Expatriate footballers in Sweden
Expatriate footballers in Belgium
Sportspeople from Pomeranian Voivodeship